WRAW (1340 kHz) is a commercial AM radio station licensed to Reading, Pennsylvania. The station is owned by iHeartMedia and calls itself "Newsradio 1340 WRAW."  It broadcasts a conservative talk radio format.

WRAW's transmitter is off South 9th Street in Reading, near the Schuylkill River.  It is powered at 1,000 watts.  The service contour covers communities such as Ephrata, Pottstown, Kutztown, Boyertown and Hamburg.

Programming
Weekdays begin with the R.J. Harris Breakfast Show simulcast from co-owned WHP 580 AM in nearby Harrisburg, Pennsylvania.  The rest of the weekday line up features mostly syndicated shows from the co-owned Premiere Networks, including Glenn Beck, The Clay Travis and Buck Sexton Show, Sean Hannity and Jesse Kelly.  Late nights, podcasts from iHeartRadio are heard, followed by Coast to Coast AM with George Noory.  

On weekends, WRAW carries In the Garden with Ron Wilson, At Home with Gary Sullivan, Leo Laporte - the Tech Guy, Bill Handel on the Law, The Weekend with Joe Pags, and Live on Sunday Night with Bill Cunningham.  Sunday mornings feature religious services and a Polka music show.  Most hours begin with world and national news from Fox News Radio.

History
WRAW is one of the oldest radio stations in Pennsylvania. In the 1960s and 70s, it had a Top 40 format. In the 1980s, it played a syndicated adult standards format, known as The Music of Your Life.

WRAW once broadcast in AM stereo using the C-QUAM system.

On February 27, 2014, WRAW changed to Spanish Contemporary, branded as "Rumba 1340".  Programming was also heard on FM translator W222BY on 92.3 FM.

On August 8, 2019, WRAW broke from simulcasting on the translator due to it being sold to Educational Media Foundation (EMF). 

On Monday, August 12, 2019, WRAW ended Spanish programming and began airing a Conservative Talk format branded as NewsRadio 1340 WRAW.  Another radio station in Reading, AM 830 WEEU, discontinued airing Rush Limbaugh's nationally syndicated show in a cost-cutting measure stemming from its parent company's bankruptcy and sale.  That prompted WRAW to pick up the broadcast, and carry other conservative talk programming, from co-owned Premiere Networks.  After Limbaugh's death in 2021, WRAW, like other talk stations owned by iHeartMedia, switched to Limbaugh's replacement, "The Clay Travis and Buck Sexton Show."

References

External links

RAW
IHeartMedia radio stations
Conservative talk radio